Jérôme Cedric Thomas (born 20 January 1979) is a French former boxer, he competed in the flyweight (– 51 kg) division as an amateur and as a bantamweight as a professional.

Amateur boxing career
Thomas won the world championship at the 2001 World Amateur Boxing Championships in Belfast, Northern Ireland. He was runner-up in 2003 losing to Somjit Jongjohor. Thomas qualified for the 2004 Summer Olympics by ending up in second place at the 2nd AIBA European 2004 Olympic Qualifying Tournament in Warsaw, Poland. In 2007, he lost early against European Champion Georgy Balakshin.

Olympic career
He represented his native country at three consecutive Summer Olympics (2000-2008), winning a bronze (2000), and a silver medal (2004). At the 2008 Summer Olympics he lost in the first round.

Personal life
He was born with a condition, Poland syndrome: his left hand is smaller than the right one, his left arm is shorter than the right one, and he has almost no left pectoral muscle.

Olympic results

Professional boxing record

External links
 
 
 
 

1979 births
Living people
People from Saint-Quentin, Aisne
Flyweight boxers
Boxers at the 2000 Summer Olympics
Boxers at the 2004 Summer Olympics
Boxers at the 2008 Summer Olympics
Olympic boxers of France
Olympic silver medalists for France
Olympic bronze medalists for France
Olympic medalists in boxing
French male boxers
AIBA World Boxing Championships medalists
Medalists at the 2004 Summer Olympics
Medalists at the 2000 Summer Olympics
Mediterranean Games bronze medalists for France
Competitors at the 2001 Mediterranean Games
Sportspeople from Aisne
Mediterranean Games medalists in boxing